The Vuelta a Andalucía (Tour of Andalusia) or Ruta del Sol (Route of the Sun) is a regional Spanish road bicycle race first held in 1925. Since 2005, it has been a 2.1 category race on the UCI Europe Tour. The race became a part of the new UCI ProSeries in 2020. The nickname, Ruta del Sol, is in reference to the region's popular tourist coastline the Costa del Sol.

Winners

Multiple winners

Wins per country

References

External links
  

 
UCI Europe Tour races
Cycle races in Spain
Sport in Andalusia
Recurring sporting events established in 1925
1925 establishments in Spain